= 1954 Palanca Awards =

Philippine literary award

4th Palanca Memorial Awards

The 4th Carlos Palanca Memorial Awards for Literature was held to commemorate the memory of Carlos T. Palanca Sr. through an endeavor that would promote education and culture in the country. This year saw the inclusion of a new category, One-Act Play/Dulang May Isang Yugto, for both the English and Filipino Divisions.

== English Division ==
=== Short Story ===
- First Prize: Rony V. Diaz, "Death in a Sawmill"
- Second Prize: S.V. Epistola, "The Beads"
- Third Prize: Gilda Cordero Fernando, "The Morning Before Us"

=== One-Act Play ===
- First Prize: Alberto S. Florentino Jr., "The World is an Apple"
- Second Prize: Fidel Sicam, "Cowards Die a Thousand Deaths"
- Third Prize: Paulina Bautista, "Prelude to Glory"

== Filipino Division ==
=== Maikling Kwento ===
- First Prize: Teodoro Agoncillo, "Sa Kamatayan Lamang"
- Second Prize: Buenaventura S. Medina Jr., "Ang Pusa sa Aking Durungawan"
- Third Prize: Fernando L. Samonte, "Matalino ang Inaanak Ko"

=== Dulang May Isang Yugto ===
- First Prize: Dionisio S. Salazar, "Hulyo 4, 1954 A.D."
- Second Prize: Lazaro R. Banag Jr., "Ang Politiko"
- Third Prize: Deogracias Tigno Jr., "Ang Aking Kapatid"

== Sources ==
- "The Don Carlos Palanca Memorial Awards for Literature | Winners 1954". Archived from the original on 2009-10-22.
